The sixth and final season of the South Korean reality television competition show K-pop Star, also branded as K-pop Star 6: The Last Chance, that premiered in SBS on November 20, 2016, until April 9, 2017. It aired every Sunday evenings as part of the Good Sunday lineup. Yang Hyun-suk, Park Jin-young, and You Hee-yeol will return as judges.

Changes to the format have been made to the final season, with restrictions lifted for potential contestants to encourage anyone to participate in "the last chance" to become a K-pop Star. Existing trainees of companies as well as singers who have already debuted are allowed to participate. The winner of the final season will not choose which company to debut with, but instead will be jointly debuted and promoted by all three companies (YG, JYP, Antenna).

Process 
 Audition applications + Preliminary auditions (June - August 2016)

Judges 
Yang Hyun-suk (YG Entertainment) – Producer, singer
Park Jin-young (JYP Entertainment) – Executive producer, producer, singer, songwriter
You Hee-yeol (Antenna Music) – Singer, pianist

Casting Audition

Agency Casting Result

List of Contestants

JYP 
 Kim Yoon-hee (born in 2002) (former participant of Fantastic Duo season 1 episodes 27–30, duet with Lee Moon-se)
 Seok Ji-soo (born in 1999) (former participant of Fantastic Duo season 1 episodes 29–30, duet with K.Will)
 Sung Yoo-jin (born in 1992) (formerly part of The SeeYa)
 Han Byeol (born in 2006)
 Boyfriend, signed with YG Entertainment but Park Hyun-jin left YG and join Starship Entertainment  
 Park Hyun-jin (born in 2005), signed with Starship Entertainment 
 Kim Jong-seob (born in 2005), signed with YG Entertainment (Debut in P1Harmony, under FNC Entertainment)
 Trainee contestants (JYP Once)
 Kim So-hee (born in 1999) (Debut in Alice, under IOK Entertainment)
 Jeon Min-joo (born in 1994) (formerly part of The Ark, K-pop Star 2 contestant, debuted as duo Khan under Maroo Entertainment)
 Lee Soo-min (born in 1999) (Produce 101 participant, former Fantagio trainee, signed with Loen Entertainment)

YG 
 Shannon (born in 1998) (was in MBK Entertainment)
 Woo Nyeong-in (born in 1997)
 Ma Eun-jin (born in 1997) (Produce 101 participant, Coridel Entertainment, added to Playback)
 Yoo Ji-ni (born in 2003)
 Lee Seo-jin (born in 1996) (former participant of Fantastic Duo season 1, duet with Taeyang on episodes 1–2, then duet with Kim Tae-woo on special episode 23)
 Trainee contestants (YG Girls)
 Go A-ra (born in 2001) (Debut in Favorite, under Astory Entertainment)
 Kriesha Chu (born in 1998) (Urban Works Entertainment, solo debut)
 Kim Hye-rim (born in 1999) (D.Maker Entertainment, debut in Lime Soda)

Antenna 
 Lee Sung-eun (born in 2001)
 Kim Joo-eun (born in 1995)
 Ji Woo-jin (born in 1990)
 Lee Ga-young (born in 1999)
 Baek Seon-nyeo (born in 1994)

Battle Audition 
Contestants represent the company they were cast to in a 1 to 1 to 1 battle. First place automatically gets to be in the Top 10, while 3rd place is eliminated. Contestants who finish in 2nd place battle the other contestants who finished 2nd place. Anyone who does not get in the Top 10 teams/contestants is eliminated. For trainees, the winner team advances to Top 10 and lose team joined other contestants in 2nd place for rematch individually.

Top 10 Rematch

Stage Auditions 
 For the Top 8 Finals, the Top 10 competed in two groups on stage with the results determined by the judges. The top three contestants from each group were chosen to proceed to the next round.
 The Top 8, who proceeded to the live stage, were determined by the three judges as well as a 100-member Audience Judging Panel. The last two contestants from each group became Elimination Candidates, with the Audience Judging Panel voting for their preferred act. The two acts with the most votes from the four Elimination Candidates proceeded to the Top 8, with the other two contestants eliminated.

 The Top 8 competes 1:1 on the live stage with the results determined by the judges. One contestant from each group is chosen to proceed to the next round.
 The contestants not chosen will go through voting by 100 citizen judges, where the three top contestants will proceed to the next round.

 Trainee contestants is reform into two girl groups (each group contains 3 people).
 For the Top 6, Top 4 and Finals, the judges and viewers' scores were weighted 60:40, and were combined to eliminate the contestant with the lowest score.

References

 
2016 South Korean television series debuts